The 69th annual Berlin International Film Festival took place from 7 to 17 February 2019. French actress Juliette Binoche served as the Jury President. Lone Scherfig's drama film The Kindness of Strangers opened the festival. The Golden Bear was won by Israeli-French drama Synonyms directed by Nadav Lapid, which also served as the closing film of the festival.

Jury

Main competition

The following were on the jury for the Berlinale Competition section:

International jury
 Juliette Binoche, actress (France) - Jury President
 Justin Chang, journalist and film critic (United States)
 Sandra Hüller, actress (Germany)
 Sebastián Lelio, film director and screenwriter (Chile)
 Rajendra Roy, chief curator of MoMA (United States)
 Trudie Styler, actress, producer and film director (United Kingdom)

First Feature Award Jury
The following people were on the jury for the Best First Feature Award:

 Katja Eichinger, journalist, writer and film producer (Germany)
 Alain Gomis, film director and screenwriter (France)
 Vivian Qu, director, screenwriter and film producer (China)

Documentary Award Jury
The following people were on the jury for the Documentary Award:

 Maria Bonsanti, artistic director and director of the Eurodoc program (Italy)
 Gregory Nava, film director, screenwriter and producer (United States)
 Maria Ramos, film director (Brazil)

International Short Film Jury
The following people were on the jury for the Berlinale Shorts section:

 Jeffrey Bowers, curator (United States)
 Vanja Kaludjercic, programmer and purchasing director of MUBI (Croatia)
 Koyo Kouoh, author, curator and artistic director of RAW Material Company (Cameroon)

In competition
The following films were selected for the main competition for the Golden Bear and Silver Bear awards:

Out of competition
The following films were selected to be screened out of competition:

Panorama
The following films were selected for the Panorama section:

Panorama Dokumente
The following films were selected for the Panorama Dokumente section:

Berlinale Special
The following films were selected for the Berlinale Special section:

Key
{| class="wikitable" width="550" colspan="2"
| style="text-align:center;"| *
|LGBTQ feature; eligible for the Teddy Award
|}

Awards

The following prizes were awarded:

 Golden Bear – Synonyms by Nadav Lapid
 Silver Bear Grand Jury Prize – By the Grace of God by François Ozon
 Alfred Bauer Prize (Silver Bear) – System Crasher by Nora Fingscheidt
 Silver Bear for Best Director – Angela Schanelec for I Was at Home, But
 Silver Bear for Best Actress – Yong Mei for So Long, My Son
 Silver Bear for Best Actor – Wang Jingchun for So Long, My Son
 Silver Bear for Best Script – Maurizio Braucci, Claudio Giovannesi and Roberto Saviano for Piranhas
 Silver Bear for Outstanding Artistic Contribution – Rasmus Videbæk for Cinematography in Out Stealing Horses
 Golden Bear for Best Short Film – Umbra by Florian Fischer and Johannes Krell
 Panorama Audience Award
 1st Place: 37 Seconds by Hikari
 2nd Place: Stitches by Miroslav Terzić
 3rd Place: Buoyancy by Rodd Rathjen
 Panorama Audience Award – Documentaries
 1st Place: Talking About Trees by Suhaib Gasmelbari
 2nd Place: Midnight Traveler by Hassan Fazili and Emelie Mahdavian
 3rd Place: Shooting the Mafia by Kim Longinotto
 Teddy Award
 Best Feature Film: Brief Story from the Green Planet by Santiago Loza
 Best Documentary/Essay Film: Lemebel by Joanna Reposi Garibaldi
 Best Short Film: Entropia by Flóra Anna Buda
 Special Jury Award: A Dog Barking at the Moon by Xiang Zi
 Special Teddy Award: Falk Richter
 FIPRESCI Prize
 Competition: Synonyms by Nadav Lapid
 Panorama: Dafne by Federico Bondi
 Forum: Die Kinder der Toten by Kelly Copper and Pavol Liska
 Prize of the Ecumenical Jury
 Competition: God Exists, Her Name Is Petrunija by Teona Strugar Mitevska
 Panorama: Buoyancy by Rodd Rathjen
 Special Mention: Midnight Traveler by Hassan Fazili and Emelie Mahdavian
 Forum: Earth by Nikolaus Geyrhalter
 CICAE Art Cinema Award
 Panorama: 37 Seconds by HIKARI
 Forum: Our Defeats by Jean-Gabriel Périot
 Generation 14Plus
 Crystal Bear for Best Film: Stupid Young Heart by Selma Vilhunen
 Special Mention: We Are Little Zombies by Makoto Nagahisa
 Crystal Bear for Best Short Film: Tattoo by Farhad Delaram
 Special Mention: Four Quartets by Marco Alessi
 Generation KPlus
 Grand Prix of the Generation 14plus International Jury for the Best Film: House of Hummingbird by Kim Bo-ra
 Special Mention: Bulbul Can Sing by Rima Das
 Special Prize of the Generation 14plus International Jury for the Best Short Film: Liberty by Faren Humes
 Special Mention: The Jarariju Sisters by Jorge Cadena
 Berliner Morgenpost Readers' Jury Award
 Prize Winner: System Crasher by Nora Fingscheidt
 Tagesspiegel Readers' Jury Award
 Prize Winner: Monsters. by Marius Olteanu
 TEDDY Readers’ Award Powered by QUEER.DE
 Prize Winner: Brief Story from the Green Planet by Santiago Loza
 Guild Film Prize
 Prize Winner: God Exists, Her Name Is Petrunija by Teona Strugar Mitevska
 Caligari Film Prize
 Prize Winner: Heimat Is A Space in Time by Thomas Heise
 Heiner Carow Prize
 Prize Winner: Beauty and Decay by Annekatrin Hendel
 Compass-Perspektive-Award
 Prize Winner: Born in Evin by Maryam Zaree
 Kompagnon-Fellowship
 Perspektive Deutsches Kino: To Be Continued by Julian Pörksen
 Berlinale Talents: Transit Times by Ana-Felicia Scutelnicu
 ARTEKino International Prize
 Prize Winner: A Responsible Adult by Shira Geffen
Eurimages Co-Production Development Award
 Award Winner: Avalon PC for Alcarràs
 VFF Talent Highlight Award
 Award Winner: Vincenzo Cavallo for Bufis
 Amnesty International Film Award
 Prize Winner: Your Turn by Eliza Capai
 Label Europa Cinemas
 Prize Winner: Stitches by Miroslav Terzić
 Peace Film Prize
 Prize Winner: Your Turn by Eliza Capai
 Special Mention: System K by Renaud Barret
 Special Mention: Midnight Traveler by Hassan Fazili and Emelie Mahdavian

References

External links

Berlin International Film Festival

69
2019 film festivals
2019 in Berlin
2019 festivals in Europe
2019 in German cinema